The 1999 NCAA Division I Women's Golf Championships were contested at the 18th annual NCAA-sanctioned golf tournament to determine the individual and team national champions of women's Division I collegiate golf in the United States.

The tournament was held at the Tulsa Country Club in Tulsa, Oklahoma.

Due to rain, only the first three rounds of play were completed.

Duke won the team championship, the Blue Devils' first.

Grace Park, from Arizona State, won the individual title.

Individual results

Individual champion
 Grace Park, Arizona State (212, −1)

Team leaderboard

 DC = Defending champion
 Debut appearance

References

NCAA Women's Golf Championship
Golf in Oklahoma
NCAA Women's Golf Championship
NCAA Women's Golf Championship
NCAA Women's Golf Championship